Corporate America may refer to:

An informal (and sometimes derogatory) phrase describing the world of corporations and big business within the United States.
Corporate America (album), a 2002 album by the rock band Boston

See also
Economy of the United States

Political terminology of the United States